In Judaism, the dough offering (or mitzvat terumat challah, "commandment of separating challah" ) is a positive commandment requiring the owner of a bread dough to give a part of the kneaded dough to a kohen (Jewish priest). The obligation to separate the dough offering (henceforth: challah) from the dough begins the moment the dough is kneaded, but may also be separated after the loaves are baked. This commandment is one of the twenty-four kohanic gifts, and, by a biblical injunction, is only obligatory in the Land of Israel, but from a rabbinic injunction applies also to breadstuffs made outside the Land of Israel. 

The common modern practice in Orthodox Judaism is to burn (although simply throwing away the dough in a double-wrapped container is allowed) the portion to be given the Kohen, although giving the challah to a Kohen for consumption is permitted—even encouraged—outside Israel (permitted with restrictions, see article below for detail).

In the Hebrew Bible 
The origin of the offering is found in Book of Numbers 15:17–21:

In the above passage "cake" is khallah (Heb. ) while "of dough" is ʿarisah (Heb. ). The return of the Jews from the Babylonian exile marked a renewal in adherence to numerous commandments, and the dough offering, "the first fruits of our dough," is listed as one of them (Nehemiah 10:37).

In the Mishnah and Talmud
The Mishnah and Jerusalem Talmud contain a tractate known as Challah dealing with the dough offering. Among the rulings, only five grains require the separation of the dough offering: wheat, barley, spelt, wild barley (or oats), and rye. In the same tractate is stated the prohibition of setting aside dough offering and tithes from dough made from "new" grain (chadash), on behalf of dough made from "old" grain (yashan). The Jerusalem Talmud implies that the commandment was given before the sin of the Twelve Spies.

Certain preparations of dough were exempt from the duty of separating the dough-offering, such as Sūfgenīn dough that was made with a thin-batter, variously mixed with spices or milk-products, and deep-fried in oil to be made into fritters. Included in this exemption is dough that has been kneaded with milk and honey to be deep-fried over a stove into honey-cakes (Hebrew: dūḇshanīn). Although exempt from the dough-offering, they still require the separation of regular tithes. The Jerusalem Talmud makes the exemption of separating the dough-offering contingent upon breadstuffs that have been cooked in a frying pan or pot over a stove, rather than baked in an oven. If these were baked as bread in an oven, they would still require the separation of the dough-offering. A quantity of dough equalling 1.6 kilogram or more which was prepared to make hardened biscuits (Hebrew: qanūḇqa’ot) requires the separation of the dough offering.

In Halakha 
The halakhic sources for the mitzvah are Shulhan Arukh, Yoreh Deah 322 and Mishneh Torah Bikkurim Chapter 5 Section 1.

The mitzvah of challah is believed by some textual scholars to originate in the priestly source and to postdate the Challah law codes as presented in the Torah.

Rabbinical interpretations
Challah, as one of the twenty-four kohanic gifts, was a means of sustenance for the kohanim, who, because of their expected full-time involvement with Temple duties and Torah instruction, were not intended to have land or income derived from it, unlike the other tribes of Israel (although this was often not the case during the Second Temple era).

Obadiah ben Jacob Sforno reasons that God wished to negate the negative effect of the sin of The Twelve Spies by establishing this Mitzvah in order that bracha ("divine blessing") should rest in the homes of and on the dough products of the Jews.

Shlomo Ephraim Luntschitz explains that the Land of Israel is sustained by rainfall, whereas crops in Egypt are irrigated by the waters of the Nile river which requires human intervention, making it logical that the first fruits of Israel be presented to God who brings its rainfall.

Other insights on the symbolism of Challah appear in Midrashic and Kabbalistic literature. The Mitzvah of separating challah is traditionally regarded as one of the three Mitzvot performed especially by women (Mishnah, Shabbos 2:6).

In some Kabbalistic literature, such as Shlomo HaKohain of Greece's commentary on the Zohar, the performing of this commandment by women, who traditionally did the cooking, uplifts the dough from a state of tevel (spiritual non-readiness) and brings it to a state of khullin (mundane and permitted to its owner), thereby correcting the action of Eve who gave of the forbidden fruit to her husband.

The components of the Mitzvah
The mitzvah of challah is one mitzvah with two parts: (1) separating the required dough (Hafrashat challah), (2) giving the dough to a Kohen (Netinat Challah). Nachmanides as well as the Tosafist Isaiah di Trani explain that it is the actual giving of the Challah portion to the Kohen that is the primary component of the Mitzvah.

According to the Talmud, the requirement to separate Challah from the dough was imposed on the owner of the dough, not on the person who kneaded it; hence if the owner was not Jewish, even if the kneader was, Hafrashat Challah was not mandatory. The requirement does not apply to quantities of less than one omer, neither to bread prepared as animal feed. Although the Biblical expression when you eat of the bread of the land might be understood as applying only to bread eaten in the Land of Israel, Rabbinic sources interpret that Hafrashat Challah should be observed in the Diaspora as well.

Minimal amount of source dough
The minimal quantity of dough whose preparation mandates the performance of the Mitzvah is quantified by Chazal as a portion of flour equivalent to 43 and 1/5 eggs, also known as one omer (one-tenth of an ephah). According to Maimonides, it is possible to test the trigonometric calculations for the volume of 43.2 eggs. This said quantity of flour can be measured by filling-up a space 10 fingerbreadths x 10 fingerbreadths square (the finger's breadth being appx. 2.5 cm), with a depth of 3 fingerbreadths and 1/10 of another fingerbreadth, along with a little more than 1/100 of another fingerbreadth. In modern terms;
 The quantity that qualifies the reciting of a Brocha is about 1.64 kg. (Some do not recite a blessing unless the quantity is above 2.25 kg.)
 A quantity of flour weighing between approximately 2 lb 11oz (1.23 kg) and 3 lb 11oz (1.666 kg) qualifies for giving Challah but no Brocha is recited

Amount of the actual gift
The Torah does not specify how much dough is required to be given to the Kohen, this is discussed in the Talmud. The rabbinical stipulation is that 1/24 is to be given in the case of private individuals, and 1/48 in the case of a commercial bakery. If the baker forgets to set aside Challah, it is permissible to set aside Challah portion of the bread after it has been baked.

Miscellaneous specifics
The Mitzvah is listed as one in effect in Israel even during the Shmittah (Sabbatical) year. Even the pauper who is entitled to collect Peah and would be exempt from giving Ma'aser (Tithe) is obligated to give Challah from his dough portion. The dough from Maaser Sheni, is likewise not exempt from Challah giving.

Divine consequence

The Mitzvah in modern practice 
The consumption of Challah by a Kohen in the Land of Israel is forbidden by Torah law due to the absence of the ashes of the Red Heifer necessary for ritual purity.

With this in mind, the Tosefta, followed by the Rishonim, encouraged the act of separating "Challah" in order that the Mitzvah not be forgotten entirely, along with the full recitation of a blessing before the dough is separated. The blessing recited is "asher kiddeshanu bemitzvotav ve'tzivanu le'hafrish challah."

The common practice of Diaspora Jewry is to burn the Challah; home bakers fulfill this by tossing the Challah to the back of the oven. However, it is Halachically permitted in the Diaspora to give the separated Challah to a Kohen for consumption, and even encouraged by some Rabbinic authorities, with the provision that the Kohen has immersed in a Mikvah. The Kohen is also required to recite the required Beracha thanking God for sanctifying the Kohanim with the sanctity of Aharon. In Yemen, whenever baking a quantity of dough which required the separation of the dough-offering, one small loaf of flatbread was removed from the batch and designated as Challah and burnt, while another small loaf of flatbread from the same batch, being non-consecrated bread, was given to a small child of the priestly stock and eaten by him, so that the practice of giving the Challah would not be forgotten amongst Israel.

If no separation is done while cooking, it can be done afterwards without a blessing.

Passover Challah from Shmurah Matzah 

The commentators to the Shulchan Aruch record that it is the Minhag of some Diaspora Jews to be scrupulous in giving Challah (in this case fully baked passover matzah) from the dough used for baking "Matzot Mitzvah" (the Shmurah Matzah eaten during Passover) to a Kohen minor to eat.

Kohanim of the diaspora have begun initiating requests from Jewish communities and prominent Rabbis to widely implement this Minhag, citing that its implementation would increase in Kiddush Hashem (per the unique brocha requirement) and reawaken awareness of the key component of the mitzvah of challah -the actual giving of the challah to the Kohen.

Daily challah yield 

As of 2011, there are approximately 13 shmurah matzah bakeries in the diaspora.  Collectively, the amount of challah produced is as follows (approximate):

See also 
 Presumption of priestly descent

References

External links
Chabad.org: The Dough Offering

Challah
Jewish law and rituals
Kosher food
Priesthood (Judaism)
Jewish sacrificial law
Positive Mitzvoth
Ancient Israel and Judah
Articles containing video clips
Land of Israel laws in Judaism